Diamond rattlesnake may refer to:

Crotalus adamanteus, a.k.a. the eastern diamondback rattlesnake, a venomous pitviper species found in the southeastern United States
Crotalus atrox, a.k.a. the western diamondback rattlesnake, a venomous pitviper species found in the United States and Mexico
Crotalus ruber, a.k.a. the red diamond rattlesnake, a venomous pitviper species found in southwestern California in the United States and Baja California in Mexico

Animal common name disambiguation pages